Powder is an Indian crime television series which  aired on Sony Entertainment Television from 3 January 2010 to 24 June 2010.

Plot

Powder is about the narcotics trade in Mumbai, and two men who are on the opposite ends of the law—Head of the NCB (Narcotics Control Bureau) Usmaan Malik (Manish Choudhary) and Mumbai drug kingpin Naved Ansari (Pankaj Tripathi). Both Usmaan and Naved grew up in the slums of Mumbai and chose different paths that eventually put them in front of each other. The biggest challenge for Usmaan and his team at NCB is to connect Naved with any drug bust or evidence, mainly because Naved is a ghost who does not exist in any civil records. Naved on the other hand, while fending off the authorities off his back, also struggles to climb the political ladder of his own business. The show explores the basic human traits like greed, loyalty, power, friendship, love and betrayal—while showing how the drug trade and authorities function.

During the end of the series, a real life detective from DRI (Directorate of Revenue Intelligence), an institution that had also been portrayed in the series, applauded the makers for their tedious research work and steadfast allegiance to reality. The show was widely lauded for its storytelling and execution, but fell prey to low ratings and kept being pushed into the late night slots.

Cast

Usmaan Ali Malik- Played by Manish Choudhary, Usmaan is the superintendent of the Narcotics Control Bureau, Mumbai.
Naved Ansari- The kingpin of the Mumbai drug scene, played by Pankaj Tripathi.
Rati- played by Rasika Dugal.
Brinda Sawhney- A new recruit who is the only female officer in the NCB. Played by Geetika Tyagi.
Mahendra Ranade- A young, tough intelligence officer in the NCB. Played by Rahul Bagga.
Mr. Joshi- An  Investigation Officer. Played by Shahab Khan.
Umesh Jagdale - A cop, played by Vikas Kumar.

References

External links
Official website of Powder

Sony Entertainment Television original programming
Indian crime television series
2010 Indian television series debuts
2010 Indian television series endings
Television series about illegal drug trade
Hindi-language television shows
Television series about organized crime
Works about organised crime in India